Adapalene/benzoyl peroxide, sold under the brand name Epiduo among others, is a fixed-dose combination medication for the treatment of severe acne vulgaris. It consists of a combination of adapalene and benzoyl peroxide in a topical gel formulation.

It is available as a generic medication.

Medical uses 
Adapalene/benzoyl peroxide is indicated for the topical treatment of acne vulgaris.

Side effects
Commonly reported side effects include the following:
 Skin redness
 Scaling
 Dry skin
 Contact dermatitis
 Skin irritation
 Stinging
 Burning

Research 
Meta-analysis of clinical trials has shown this combined therapy to be more effective than either of its ingredients by themselves.

The use of adapalene/benzoyl peroxide in combination with oral antibiotics (lymecycline) has been studied; the combination was well tolerated and showed an improved success rate compared to those receiving only antibiotics (47.6% vs. 33.7%, P = 0.002).

References

External links 
 

Anti-acne preparations
Combination drugs